Sir James Morse Carmichael, 3rd Baronet (20 July 1844 – 31 May 1902) was a Scottish civil servant and Liberal politician.

Background
He was the only son of Sir James Carmichael, 2nd Baronet and his wife Louisa Charlotte Butler, daughter of Sir Thomas Butler, 8th Baronet. Carmichael was educated at Radley College. In 1883, he succeeded his father as baronet and 26th Chief of the Name and Arms of Carmichael. He claimed the dormant title Earl of Hyndford, however was rejected.

Career
Carmichael was appointed a Clerk in Admiralty in 1862, a post he held until 1880. He was attached to Sir William Hutt in 1864 and became private secretary to John Bright in 1873. Between 1882 and 1885 he served in same capacity to the Chancellor of the Exchequer Hugh Childers and subsequently to the prime minister William Ewart Gladstone until 1886.

Carmichael contested Northamptonshire North unsuccessfully in 1885, and Northamptonshire South one year later. He entered the British House of Commons in 1892, sitting as Member of Parliament (MP) for Glasgow St Rollox until 1895.

He died at his residence in Westminster on 31 May 1902 aged 57 and unmarried. With his death the baronetcy became extinct.

References

External links

1844 births
1902 deaths
Baronets in the Baronetage of the United Kingdom
Members of the Parliament of the United Kingdom for Glasgow constituencies
UK MPs 1892–1895
People educated at Radley College
Scottish Liberal Party MPs